The 1920 Princeton Tigers football team was an American football team that represented Princeton University as an independent during the 1920 college football season. They finished with a 6–0–1 record, shut out four of seven opponents, and outscored all opponents by a total of 144 to 23. the sole blemish on the team's record was a 14–14 tie with Harvard in a road game in Boston. Bill Roper was the head coach for the seventh year. Keene Fitzpatrick, Frank Glick, and Jack Winn were assistant coaches. Henry Callahan was the team captain.

There was no contemporaneous system in 1920 for determining a national champion. However, Princeton was retroactively named as the co-national champion by  the Boand System and Parke H. Davis. The 1920 California Golden Bears football team were selected as national champion by the majority of selectors.

Two Princeton players, quarterback Donold Lourie and tackle Stan Keck, were selected as consensus first-team players on the 1920 All-America team. Keck was later inducted into the College Football Hall of Fame. Other notable players included fullback Hank Garrity and end Armant Legendre.

Schedule

References

Princeton
Princeton Tigers football seasons
College football national champions
College football undefeated seasons
Princeton Tigers football